The Military ranks of Bangladesh are the military insignia used by the Bangladesh Armed Forces. Bangladesh, like India and Pakistan, shares a rank structure similar to that of the United Kingdom.

Commissioned officer ranks
The rank insignia of commissioned officers.

Other ranks
The rank insignia of non-commissioned officers and enlisted personnel.

Other appointments
Sergeants holds key appointments in companies, batteries (company equivalent of artillery), infantry battalions and artillery regiments, e.g. Company Quartermaster Sergeant (CQMS), Regimental Sergeant Major (RSM), persons holding these appointments have separate rank insignias though these are not actually ranks.

References

External links
 Rank Categories in Official Website of Bangladesh Army
 
 
 
 
 
 

 
Military units and formations established in 1971